Wilhelm Crinius (2 December 1920 – 26 April 1997) was a Luftwaffe fighter ace during World War II. A flying ace or fighter ace is a military aviator credited with shooting down five or more enemy aircraft during aerial combat. Crinius is credited with 114 aerial victories claimed in approximately 400 combat missions. He recorded 100 victories over the Eastern Front. Of his 14 victories claimed over the Western Front, one was a four-engined bomber. On 23 September 1942, Crinius became the only German fighter pilot to be awarded the Knight's Cross of the Iron Cross and the Knight's Cross of the Iron Cross with Oak Leaves simultaneously.

Early life and career
Wilhelm Crinius was born in Hohenhausen, Kalletal on 2 December 1920. His father, also named Wilhelm, was a master craftsman and house painter and decorator, his mother née Tölle. Crinius attended the Volksschule, a primary school, in Hohenhausen from 1927 until 1935. In 1935 he started his merchant apprenticeship at the savings and loans bank in Hohenhausen. Parallel to his apprenticeship, he attended the vocational school. He worked at the saving and loans bank in Hohenhausen as an employee from Easter 1938 until November 1938. 

In the summer of 1939, Crinus served in the compulsory labour service (Reichsarbeitsdienst), working in a construction unit on the Westwall, a fortified defensive line on Germany's western border. In January 1940, Crinius joined the Luftwaffe and was trained as a pilot.

World War II
In February 1942, Gefreiter (lance corporal) Crinius was posted to 3. Staffel (3rd squadron) of Jagdgeschwader 53 (JG 53—53rd Fighter Wing) based in Sicily. In March and April 1942, he flew 60 missions over Malta. On 1 April, he was promoted to Unteroffizier (non-commissioned officer). In May 1942, I./JG 53 was transferred to the Eastern Front near Kursk. Crinius achieved his first victories on 9 June when he shot down two Il-2 Sturmoviks. On 8 July, Crinius shot down two Douglas Boston bombers west of Voronezh, although his aircraft was hit by Russian anti-aircraft fire and he was forced to belly-landed his Messerschmitt Bf 109 F-4 (Werknummer 10243—factory number) between the enemy lines, where he was rescued by a German patrol and safely returned to his unit.

In July 1942, I./JG 53 was sent to the southern sector of the Eastern Front, where Crinius claimed his 15th kill on 1 August. He claimed his 24th victory on 11 August 1942. The next day I./JG 53 relocated from Bereska to Tusov, closer to the front and Crinius shot down three Mikoyan-Gurevich MiG-3s, bringing his total to 27 victories. Crinius recorded his 49th victory on 27 August which was also the 1,000th victory for I. Gruppe (1st group) of JG 53. After his 55th victory on 1 September he was promoted to Feldwebel (Sergeant). Hereafter Crinius was particularly successful, claiming some 40 victories in August and 46 victories in the timeframe 1–22 September, including his 100th on 22 September. He was the 22nd Luftwaffe pilot to achieve the century mark. 

Together with Friedrich-Karl Müller, Crinius received the Knight's Cross of the Iron Cross with Oak Leaves on 23 September 1942. He was the 127th member of the German armed forces to be so honored. Three other Luftwaffe officers were presented with the Oak Leaves that day by Hitler, Oberleutnant Müller, Oberleutnant Wolfgang Tonne and Leutant Hans Beißwenger. Crinius was promoted to Leutnant der Reserve (second lieutenant of the reserves) on 1 October 1942. Following the presentation, Müller, Tonne and Crinius were ordered to Berlin where they made a propaganda appearance at the "House of the Press". At the same time, I. Gruppe of JG 53 relocated from the Eastern Front to Comiso Airfiled in Sicily where they arrived on 10 October.

In November 1942, Crinius relocated with I./JG 53 to Tunisia. In Africa, Crinius claimed another 14 victories, including a B-17 Flying Fortress on 26 December 1942 over Bizerte. On 13 January 1943, he engaged in aerial combat with Royal Air Force (RAF) Supermarine Spitfire fighters near El Kala, Crinius' aircraft was hit and he was wounded in the thigh. Breaking off combat, he headed for his base but his engine then caught fire. He ditched his damaged Bf 109 G-2 (Werknummer 10805) in the sea. He spent 24 hours in the water before being rescued by French sailors and Arabs. After hospitalisation for his wounds, Crinius became a prisoner of war.

Later life
After World War II, Wilhelm Crinius worked in private industry, serving as a director in the German branch of the Dutch Philips GmbH. He was appointed chairman of the board of directors of the Ernst Düllmann GmbH in 1971. On 18 June 1989, as a pensioner, Crinius ran for the European Parliament in Hesse as  candidate for the right-wing German People's Union (Deutsche Volksunion). He died on 26 April 1997 in Stuhr-Fahrenhorst, Lower Saxony.

Summary of career

Aerial victory claims
According to US historian David T. Zabecki, Crinius was credited with 114 aerial victories. Mathews and Foreman, authors of Luftwaffe Aces — Biographies and Victory Claims, researched the German Federal Archives and found records for 114 aerial victory claims. This figure includes 100 aerial victories on the Eastern Front and 14 over the Western Allies, including one four-engined bomber.

Victory claims were logged to a map-reference (PQ = Planquadrat), for example "PQ 39242". These sectors were then subdivided into 36 smaller units to give a location area 3 × 4 km in size.

Awards
 Front Flying Clasp of the Luftwaffe for Fighter Pilots in Gold
 Bronze (30 March 1942)
 Silver (29 April 1942)
 Gold (18 August 1942)
 Iron Cross (1939)
 2nd class (19 June 1941)
 1st class (20 July 1941)
 Ehrenpokal der Luftwaffe on 13 September 1942 as Unteroffizier and pilot
 Knight's Cross of the Iron Cross with Oak Leaves
 Knight's Cross on 23 September 1942 and Feldwebel and pilot in the 3./Jagdgeschwader 53
 127th Oak Leaves on 23 September 1942 and Feldwebel and pilot in the 3./Jagdgeschwader 53

Notes

References

Citations

Bibliography

 
 
 
 
 
 
 
 
 
 
 
 
 
 
 
 
 Weal, John (2001). Aces of the Russian Front. Oxford: Osprey Publishing Limited. .
 Weal, John (2007). Jagdgeschwader 53 'Pik-As'. Osprey Publishing. .
 

1920 births
1997 deaths
German World War II flying aces
People from Lippe
Luftwaffe pilots
Recipients of the Knight's Cross of the Iron Cross with Oak Leaves
German prisoners of war in World War II held by France
Reich Labour Service members
Military personnel from North Rhine-Westphalia